Al Barnes was a college football player, a triple threat halfback for the VMI Keydets, selected All-Southern in 1927. He played quarterback on the McKeesport Olympics.

References

American football halfbacks
American football quarterbacks
VMI Keydets football players
All-Southern college football players